The Bengali Genocide Remembrance Day ( Bāṅgāli Gaṇahatyā Smaraṇ Dibas / Bangali Gonohotta Shoron Dibosh) or the Bangladesh Genocide Memorial Day is a national day of remembrance which is observed on 25 March in Bangladesh in commemoration of the victims of the Bengali genocide of 1971, unanimously approved in 2017.

History

The date 25 March commemorates Operation Searchlight, a planned military pacification carried out by the Pakistan Army, started on 25 March to curb the Bengali independence movement by taking control of the major cities on 26 March, and then eliminating all opposition, political or military, within one month. Before the beginning of the operation, all foreign journalists were systematically deported from East Pakistan.

On 11 March 2017, the Parliament of Bangladesh unanimously passed the Resolution designating 25 March as a Genocide Remembrance Day. The day honours and remembers those who suffered and died as a consequence of killings by the Pakistani Army on 25 March 1971, which started with Operation Searchlight and ended with the 1971 Bangladesh Genocide and the Independence of Bangladesh. During this period the persecution of the Bengali population by Pakistan army led by General A. A. K. Niazi was notable. It is believed this was on account of the contempt the dominant Punjabi Pakistanis had for Bengalis, there was mounting evidence that among the Bengalis, the Hindu minority was doubly marked out for persecution. In a post-war enquiry several senior Pakistani officers admitted to systematic targeting of the community on the orders from a brigadier which General Niazi denied.

"Bangladesh will reach out to UN seeking recognition of the 1971 Genocide while the government declared March 25 as Genocide Day", according to Liberation War Affairs Minister AKM Mozammel Huq.

International recognition
The government of Bangladesh is working on achieving global recognition of March 25 as “Bangladesh’s Genocide Day." Genocide Watch and Lemkin Institute for Genocide Prevention issued
statements on the Bangladesh Genocide of 1971 perpetrated against Bangladeshi people by Pakistani Army.
These statements will strengthen and accelerate Bangladesh's commitment to achieve global recognition of “Genocide Day”

Gallery

See also
 Martyred Intellectuals Day
 Language Movement Day
 Independence Day (Bangladesh)
 Armenian Genocide Remembrance Day

References

Genocide remembrance days
March observances
1971 Bangladesh genocide
Public holidays in Bangladesh
Annual events in Bangladesh